Elections to Basingstoke and Deane Borough Council took place on 5 May 2022 as part of the 2022 United Kingdom local elections.

Summary

Election result

Ward results

Basing & Upton Grey

Bramley

Brighton Hill

Brookvale & Kings Furlong

Chineham

Eastrop & Grove

Evingar

Hatch Warren & Beggarwood

Kempshott & Buckskin

Norden

Oakley & The Candovers

Popley

Sherborne St. John & Rooksdown

South Ham

Tadley & Pamber

Tadley North, Kingsclere & Baughurst

Whitchurch, Overton & Laverstoke

Winklebury & Manydown

References

2022
Basingstoke and Deane
2020s in Hampshire
May 2022 events in the United Kingdom